

Richard Wettstein (30 June 1863 in Vienna – 10 August 1931 in Trins) was an Austrian botanist. His taxonomic system, the Wettstein system, was one of the earliest based on phyletic principles.

Wettstein studied in Vienna, where he was a disciple of Anton Kerner von Marilaun (1831-1898) and married his daughter Adele. During his time at the University of Vienna, he founded the student-led Natural Science Association with his friend Karl Eggerth in 1882. He was a professor at the University of Prague from 1892, and at the University of Vienna from 1899. He newly laid out the Botanical Garden of the University of Vienna.

In 1901 he became president of the Vienna Zoological-Botanical Society (Zoologisch-Botanische Gesellschaft), and during the same year took part in a scientific expedition to Brazil. In 1919 he was appointed vice-president of the Vienna Academy of Sciences. During his later years (1929–30), he traveled with his son, Friedrich, to eastern and southern Africa.

The mycological genus Wettsteinina is named in his honor and also Wettsteiniola, which is a genus of flowering plants from Brazil, belonging to the family Podostemaceae, also honor's Richard Wettstein. 

In 1905, he was co-president of the International Botanical Congress, held in Vienna.

Selected publications  
 Grundzüge der geographisch-morphologischen Methode der Pflanzensystematik, 1898 - Basics of geographical-morphological methods of plant systematics.
 Botanik Und Zoologie In Österreich in den Jahren 1850 Bis 1900, 1901 - Botany and zoology in Austria in the years 1850 to 1900.
 Der Neo-Lamarckismus und seine Beziehungen zum Darwinismus, 1903 - Neo-Lamarckism and its relationship to Darwinism.
 
1st ed. 1901–1908 Vol. I 1901, Vol. II 1908 Deuticke, Vienna
2nd ed. 1910–1911
3rd ed. 1923–1924
4th ed. 1933–1935

See also 
 Wettstein system

Notes

References

Bibliography 

 
 
 
 
 

20th-century Austrian botanists
Austrian taxonomists
1863 births
1931 deaths
Corresponding Members of the Russian Academy of Sciences (1917–1925)
Corresponding Members of the USSR Academy of Sciences
Honorary Members of the USSR Academy of Sciences
Austrian knights
Scientists from Vienna
19th-century Austrian botanists
Members of the Royal Society of Sciences in Uppsala